Daniel e Cruz Liberal (born 22 April 2000) is a professional footballer who plays as right-back for Trofense. Born in Portugal, he represents the Angola national team.

Professional career
Liberal began his senior career with Trofense, and helped them win the 2020–21 Campeonato de Portugal and earn promotion to the Liga Portugal 2. He made his professional debut with Trofense in a 2–2 Liga Portugal 2 tie with Porto B on 7 August 2021.

International career
Born in Portugal, Liberal is of Angolan descent. He is a youth international for Angola. He debuted with the Angola national team in a 1–1 2022 FIFA World Cup qualification tie with Libya on 16 November 2021.

Honours
Trofense
Campeonato de Portugal: 2020–21

References

External links
 
 Liga Portugal profile

2000 births
Living people
Sportspeople from Vila Nova de Gaia
Angolan footballers
Angola international footballers
Angola youth international footballers
Portuguese footballers
Portuguese sportspeople of Angolan descent
Association football fullbacks
C.D. Trofense players
Liga Portugal 2 players
Campeonato de Portugal (league) players
Portuguese expatriate footballers
Portuguese expatriates in Italy
Expatriate footballers in Italy